Gale is a minor character in Greek mythology. She was a very skillful witch.

Mythology 
According to Aelian's On the Characteristics of Animals, Gale was a talented witch who dealt in herbs and potions. But she was extremely incontinent, and had abnormal sexual desires. For this Hecate, the goddess of witchcraft, turned her into a small, "evil" (in the words of Aelian) animal bearing her name, gale (a land-marten or polecat).

Thus the animal became one of the most commonly associated ones with Hecate. Martens/weasels were thought to have magical potency in ancient Greece, though not necessarily of the beneficial kind.

Gale's name shares an etymology with that of Galanthis, another mortal woman who was turned into a weasel at the hands of an angered goddess.

See also 

 Medea
 Circe
 Pasiphae
 Selene

References

Bibliography 
 
 Claudius Aelianus, On the Characteristics of Animals, translated by Alwyn Faber Scholfield (1884-1969), from Aelian, Characteristics of Animals, published in three volumes by Harvard/Heinemann, Loeb Classical Library, 1958. Online version at the Topos Text Project.

Women in Greek mythology
Hecate
Metamorphoses into animals in Greek mythology
Greek mythological witches
Witchcraft in folklore and mythology